Lindsey Butterworth (born 27 September 1992) is a Canadian middle-distance runner. She competed in the women's 800 metres at the 2017 World Championships in Athletics. She also competed at the 2019 World Championships in Athletics, reaching the semi-final in the women's 800 metres.   Named to the Canadian team for the 2020 Summer Olympics in Tokyo, Butterworth was fifth in her heat of the 800 metres and did not advance to the semi-finals.

References

External links
 
 

1992 births
Living people
Canadian female middle-distance runners
World Athletics Championships athletes for Canada
Athletes (track and field) at the 2019 Pan American Games
Pan American Games track and field athletes for Canada
Athletes (track and field) at the 2020 Summer Olympics
Olympic track and field athletes of Canada
Sportspeople from Burnaby
20th-century Canadian women
21st-century Canadian women